Linwood Cemetery may refer to:

 Linwood Cemetery, Christchurch, a cemetery in Christchurch, New Zealand
 Linwood Cemetery (Columbus, Georgia), a cemetery in Georgia, United States
 Linwood Cemetery (Dubuque), a cemetery in Iowa, United States
 Linwood Cemetery (Colchester), a cemetery in Connecticut, United States
Linwood Cemetery in the Pleasant Hill Historic District (Macon, Georgia) in Macon, Georgia